Nurul Islam Shishu is a retired General of Bangladesh Army, a vetern of Bangladesh Liberation war, and Bangladesh Nationalist Party politician. He served as the Minister of Agriculture under President Ziaur Rahman.

Career
Shishu had joined the Pakistan Army and reached the rank of Major. He served in the Inter-Services Intelligence. He was sent to East Pakistan to gather information for the ISI; which he deliberately sabotaged by disclosing his affiliation with the intelligence agency. He joined the Mukti Bahini and fought in the Bangladesh Liberation war. After the Independence of Bangladesh, he served as the defence attaché at the Bangladesh Embassy to Myanmar.

In 1976, Shishu served as the Principal Staff Officer to the Chief Martial Law Administrator.

Shishu had helped President Ziaur Rahman form Bangladesh Nationalist Party and oversaw of the recruitment of politicians in the party. He retired from Bangladesh Army, when he was 40, with the rank of Major General.

Shishu served as the Minister of Agriculture in the cabinet of President Ziaur Rahman. After the assassination of Ziaur Rahman, he served as the Secretary General of Bangladesh Nationalist Party while Khaleda Zia was the Chairperson of the Party. He was dismissed from the post of Minister by Hussain Mohammad Ershad.

Shishu moved to Oklahoma, United States in 1991.

References

Living people
Bangladesh Army generals
Year of birth missing (living people)
Mukti Bahini personnel
Bangladesh Nationalist Party politicians
General Secretaries of Bangladesh Nationalist Party
Agriculture ministers of Bangladesh
Bangladeshi emigrants to the United States